We Were Here is the second studio album by Swiss-German pop duo Boy. Produced by longtime contributor Philipp Steinke, it was released on August 21, 2015 on Grönland Records. It reached the top three on both the German and Swiss Albums Charts and entered the top five in Austria.

Track listing 
All song were written by BOY and produced by Philipp Steinke.

Charts

Weekly charts

Release history

References

External links
 

2015 albums
Boy (duo) albums
Grönland Records albums